The cabinet of Egyptian Prime Minister Ibrahim Mahlab was sworn in on 1 March 2014. The cabinet was made up of 31 ministers. It was the first government to include three Christians as successive governments had only one or two Christians.

Cabinet members

References

2014 establishments in Egypt
Cabinets of Egypt
Egypt, Cabinet
Cabinets established in 2014
2014 disestablishments in Egypt
Cabinets disestablished in 2014